The Executive Transport Wing of the Federal Ministry of Defence (abb.: FlBschftBMVg or FBS BMVg, literally translated as Flight Readiness [Service] of the Federal Ministry of Defence) is a flying formation of the German Air Force with a wide variety of tasks. Occasionally it is ambiguously listed as the Special Air Missions Wing in English language articles. The wing is based at Cologne Bonn Airport with Berlin Tegel Airport used as a location for its helicopters. It is planned to bring the two operating locations together at Berlin Brandenburg Airport (the expansion of Berlin Schönefeld) once its construction is finished.

History
The Flugbereitschaft was formed On April 1, 1957 at the Nörvenich Air Base as a small unit providing liaison flights to the Defence Ministry. In July 1959 it relocated to Cologne Bonn Airport and reformed as the 3. Squadron of the Air Force's Transport Wing 62 (3./LTG-62). In April 1963 it became an independent unit with its status raised from a squadron to a group. In 1974 its status was upgraded to a full wing (Geschwader).

As a legacy from the Second World War the role of the German military was a very sensitive topic and the Bundeswehr was constituted as a strictly defensive force within the borders of West Germany. Correspondingly the Flugbereitschaft was limited to providing government transport to federal government of defence ministry officials. With the end of the Cold War, the German reunification and the country's increased involvement in peacekeeping and humanitarian aid missions overseas at the end of the twentieth and the beginning of the twenty-first centuries came a need for air-to-air refueling and long range transport aircraft. With the addition of Airbus A310 MRTT to the Flugbereitschaft an informal distinction  was introduced for its aircraft. The government transport aircraft are called the "white fleet" (die weiße Flotte), painted in white with a thin black-red-gold stripe and a Bundesrepublik Deutschland (Federal Republic of Germany) inscription. The military transport and tanker aircraft are called the "grey fleet" (die graue Flotte), painted in grey with a Luftwaffe (German Air Force) inscription. The helicopters make an exception of this rule, sporting the retro look of the white fleet, with two tones of blue stripes on a white body and a Luftwaffe inscription. The grey fleet is subordinated to the European Air Transport Command.

West Germany had its capital in Bonn, while East Germany's capital was Berlin. With the reunification it was decided that Berlin will be the sole capital city of the country. As the institutions of the united Germany were based on the West-German ones in Bonn and could not be moved in short time, the Flugbereitschaft played an important role executing shuttle flights (Pendelflüge) for federal government officials and parliamentarians between the two cities. Additionally the wing keeps a VIP aircraft in flight readiness in Berlin detached to from its MOB at Cologne Bonn IAP. The German government and Federal Ministry of Defence plan to consolidate the wing at Berlin Brandenburg Airport.

On 15 June 2022, the wing retired its last Airbus A310 MRTT. The retirement was scheduled at the end of February 2022, but the aircraft was kept in service due to the 2022 Russian invasion of Ukraine.

Mission
The Flugbereitschaft carries out missions in the following areas:
 Air Transport:
 transport of Bundeswehr personnel and materiel
 VIP transport of government officials, members of parliament and high-ranking Bundeswehr officers
 humanitarian aid and disaster relief flights, evacuation of civilians
 MedEvac flights
 Air-to-Air Refueling:
 formation and training of tanker air crews, operational refueling flights in support of Luftwaffe and allied fighter jets
 strategic deployment of Bundeswehr and allied forces for exercises and operations
 participation in international NATO-led exercises
 Passenger and Cargo Handling, Logistic Support
 passenger control and preparation
 cargo handling for own, allied and civilian-chartered aircraft, supply of Bundeswehr forces overseas
 ground support of German and allied aircraft
 Maintenance and Overhaul:
 technical maintenance and overhaul of the Einsatzbereitschaft's fleet 
 training and skill development of flight and ground personnel
 Host Nation Support:
 transport of foreign dignitaries and high-ranking officials on official state visits to Germany
 ground support of foreign official state aircraft of visiting official delegations
 ground support for foreign delegations at Cologne Bonn Airport and Berlin Tegel Airport

Organisation
The Flugbereitschaft operates a diverse fleet of aircraft. Its main operating base is the military area of Cologne Bonn Airport with Berlin Tegel Airport used as a secondary location for its helicopters. Beginning on October 21, 2020, two years after completion and two weeks after a successful dress rehearsal, political-parliamentary flight operations officially began at the new government interim terminal at the new Berlin-Brandenburg Airport. The facility can handle up to 25 official flights per day. However, it is only a temporary terminal. The final terminal is due to be built in 2034, so that the unit's entire fleet of aircraft can move from Cologne-Wahn airport. Cougar helicopters will remain on the former Tegel airfield until 2029 due to lack of space.

Executive Transport Wing of the Federal Ministry of Defence (Flugbereitschaft des Bundesministeriums der Verteidigung) (Cologne Bonn Airport)
 Wing Headquarters
 Flight Group (Fliegende Gruppe)
 Flight Group Headquarters
 1st Air Transport Squadron (1. Lufttransportstaffel) (grey fleet)
 1x Airbus A310 MRTT 10+25 "Hermann Köhl“
 2nd Air Transport Squadron (2. Lufttransportstaffel) (white fleet)
 2x Airbus A350-941 10+03 "Kurt Schumacher", 10+01 "Konrad Adenauer" (the latter is not yet in active service)
 2x Airbus A340-313X VIP 16+01 "Konrad Adenauer", 16+02 "Theodor Heuss“
 1x Airbus A321-231 15+04 (ex. "Neustadt an der Weinstraße“ D-AISE of Lufthansa)
 3x Airbus A319-133X CJ (15+01 - 15+03)
 4x Bombardier Global Express 5000 (14+01 - 14+04)
 3x Bombardier Global Express 6000 (14+05 - 14+07)
 3rd Air Transport Squadron (3. Lufttransportstaffel) (white fleet) (Berlin Tegel Airport)
 3x Eurocopter AS 532U2 Cougar (82+01 - 82+03)
 Technical Group (Technische Gruppe)
 Technical Group Headquarters
 1st Technical Squadron (1. Technische Staffel) (maintains Airbus A310)
 2nd Technical Squadron (2. Technische Staffel) (maintains Airbus A319CJ, A321, A340-313X and Bombardier G5000)
 Airfield Squadron (Flugplatzstaffel)

Due to the geographical detachment of the 3. Air Transport Squadron from the wing's main operating location at Cologne Bonn IAP and due to the specifics of its helicopter operations, the squadron is an integrated unit, which also includes ground technical personnel in addition to its air crews.

Aircraft

Current Fleet

Current Orders

Retired Fleet

References

Executive Transport
Military units and formations established in 1974